Yumaguzino (Yomağuja) is a rural locality (a village) in Kuganakbashevsky Selsoviet, Sterlibashevsky District, Bashkortostan, Russia. The population was 164 as of 2010. There are 4 streets.

Geography 
Yumaguzino is located 20 km northeast of Sterlibashevo (the district's administrative centre) by road. Novoivanovka is the nearest rural locality.

References 

Rural localities in Sterlibashevsky District